Ahmet Dursun (born 25 January 1978) is a Turkish former professional footballer.

Career
Dursun started his career in Germany when he signed for SG Wattenscheid 09. In 1996, he was transferred to the Turkish club Kocaelispor and he was selected for the Turkey national under-21 football team. In the 1999–2000 season, he was signed by Istanbul club Beşiktaş J.K. and he scored 21 goals in his first season. After such a successful year, the pressure of maintaining that high level of football got to him and he transferred to a China to play for Tianjin Teda.

Dursun made his comeback in the 2004–05 season signing on with another Istanbul club, Istanbulspor. Before the second half of the season could even begin, Beşiktaş J.K. immediately re-signed him.

References

External links
 
 
 

1978 births
Living people
Turkish footballers
Turkey international footballers
Turkey under-21 international footballers
SG Wattenscheid 09 players
2. Bundesliga players
Süper Lig players
Kocaelispor footballers
Tianjin Jinmen Tiger F.C. players
Beşiktaş J.K. footballers
İstanbulspor footballers
Expatriate footballers in Azerbaijan
MKE Ankaragücü footballers
Turanspor footballers
Expatriate footballers in China
Khazar Lankaran FK players
Adanaspor footballers
German people of Turkish descent
German expatriates in China
Turkish expatriate sportspeople in Azerbaijan
Turkish expatriate sportspeople in China
Association football forwards